Edward Alfred C. Douglas, sometimes known as Eddie Douglas, was an English professional footballer who made over 100 appearances as an outside left in the Football League for Brentford.

Career 
Douglas began his career with Northern League club Crook Town. Following abortive spells at Football League clubs Newcastle United and Crystal Palace, he resumed his career with stints at North Eastern League clubs West Stanley and Washington Colliery. Douglas was handed another chance at league football with Third Division South club Brentford in 1925 and went on to become a regular pick as an outside left, making 109 appearances and scoring 21 goals in a four-season spell. Douglas' performances won him the attention of Second Division club Reading and he moved to Elm Park in an exchange deal for Billy Lane in 1929. He made only a handful of appearances for the Royals and ended his career with spells at Bristol Rovers and Guildford City.

Career statistics

Honours 
Brentford

 London Charity Fund: 1928

References

Year of death unknown
People from Hebburn
Footballers from Tyne and Wear
English footballers
Association football outside forwards
Brentford F.C. players
English Football League players
1899 births
Crook Town A.F.C. players
Newcastle United F.C. players
Crystal Palace F.C. players
Southern Football League players
West Stanley F.C. players
Northern Football League players
Washington Colliery F.C. players
Reading F.C. players
Bristol Rovers F.C. players
Guildford City F.C. players